Kamen Petkov (Bulgarian: Камен Петков, 1863–1945) was a Bulgarian architect based in Plovdiv, Bulgaria.

Biography

Arch. Kamen Petkov was born in 1863 in the small village Beloptichene (today Ruzhintsi) Belogradchishko, son of Petko Simeonov. After completing high school in Vratsa, completed his military service and worked for several years as a teacher. He had a desire to study in the Academy of Arts. At that time, scholarships for this school not leave because it was considered that Bulgaria it need more builders – engineers and architects. Thus, in 1892, Kamen Petkov goes to study architecture as a government scholar at the Polytechnic of Karlsruhe, Germany, where he graduated in 1896. After graduation, he returned to Bulgaria and began working in Vratsa, Vidin and some time in Sofia where together with the artist Alexander Bozhilov and other take part in the Circle "Bulgaria".

In 1898 he moved to Plovdiv, loves the city and worked there for 47 years until his death on February 17, 1945.

Career

Arch. Kamen Petkov (1863, the region of Belogradchik, north-west of Sofia  – 1945, Plovdiv) graduated from the Technical University of Karlsruhe (TH), Germany in 1896.  Back in Bulgaria he worked  for a short spell  in Sofia where he collaborated, together with the painter Alexander Bozhinov Александър Божинов, in the “Balgaran” group.  In 1898 he established his practice in Plovdiv and worked there for 47 years till his death in 1945.

He designed and built more than 800 buildings in Plovdiv alone.  Most of them still shape the specific architecture of the city centre.  Ten exquisite   buildings can be seen along the Main Street alone, beginning with the powerful impact of the Bulgarian Bank (1898), and followed by smaller elegant  buildings very much influenced by the Vienna Secession architects.  Their façades are lavishly decorated with fluted pilasters crowned with composite capitals; arched windows articulated by decorative columns, curvilinear ornaments and many other elegant details.  Plant-inspired motifs such as blossoming small trees, ornamental garlands, festoons of flowers, etc., disclose a strong Art Nouveau influence.

In the French girls college, 1915 and  boys college, 1932 respectively, however,  he opted for a drastic geometric design.  The contrasting frames of the shallow-arched windows and the dark highly stylized  stucco pilasters create a strong graphic effect.

The four- and  six-floor high tobacco warehouses are among Petkov's  biggest  works.  The mansard above the main cornice is supported by massive consoles.  Fluted risers articulate the large volumes into proportionate shapes.  The design is an excellent mature integration of the functional and aesthetic aspects of a building for the  industry.

In his early seventies Kamen Petkov won a competition organised by the Vatican among Bulgarian and Italian architects for the reconstruction and building of several Catholic churches  in the region of Plovdiv which had been severely damaged in an earthquake in 1928.  Thus he came to design the frontal part and the interior of the largest Catholic cathedral in the Balkan peninsula.  This time he draws on the Italian neoclassicism.  The main facade  is very elaborate with six pairs of columns  articulating  the ground floor and four pairs above them emphasise the main entrance.  Two cornices form the base of the frontón which is flanked by the statues of St. Peter and St. Paul and decorated with stylised floral forms.

Of the Catholic churches  built by Kamen Petkov around Plovdiv, the ones in the villages of Gen. Nikolaevo and Sekirovo are the largest with capacity for 2000 people.  Both are designed as three-nave basilicas  with two bell towers and a frontón in between. The façades are elaborately decorated with columns and pilasters, plastic cornices and stucco ornaments.

During his long creative life Kamen Petkov left numerous lovingly designed buildings in a Bulgarian strain of the Art Nouveau movement which renders evident the ample extent and diversity of this ground-breaking phenomenon.

Works
By the time Arch. Kamen Petkov arrived in Plovdiv, there already worked one more arch. Joseph Schnitter, with whom he became friends, Arch. M. Pernigoni with whom participated in the design of several buildings architect. Andronikos and arch. A. Torniov that leaving the city wrote in the local newspaper that "... is calm, because here he will be replaced by arch. Kamen Petkov ... ".

In 1903 in Plovdiv Arch. Kamen Petkov married Radka Georgieva Popova, the daughter of a socially prominent  Georgi Popov from city Tryavna- associate of Vasil Levski and member of its revolutionary committee. From their marriage were born four children – a daughter – musical pedagogue, one more daughter – philologists, and two sons – a journalist and an architect. His son Arch. George K. Petkov (1917–1991) as an architect also devotes his entire life to Plovdiv. His grandson Arch. Kamen Petkov (1950–1993) also designed and built in Plovdiv until his premature death. Now as an architect in Plovdiv works grandson Kamen Petkov, Arch. Georgi Petkov K. (1973 -).

Only in Plovdiv Arch. Kamen Petkov designed and built about 800 buildings. Moreover, his work are the houses of Orozov and Shipkov in city Kazanlak (later used for the Town Council), the house of Dr. T. Vitanov in city Vidin (subsequently used for the Youth House), the Bulgarian National Bank in city Burgas. Pretty houses in Plovdiv are already demolished – Samokovlieva house, demolished during the construction of the tunnel under Nebet, house Kalchev, replacing the Party House and many others – one torn down for new construction, others collapsed the time.

Some designed by the architect. K. Petkov buildings require distinctly in the architectural appearance of the city. They still mark the major ensembles of the center and outlines the architectural skeleton of Plovdiv after the Liberation.

Building technology in the late 19th and early 20th century

By the time Arch. K. Petkov begins work, the walls of the buildings were always massive – foundations and cellar of stonework and up bearing brick walls. Inter-floor structures are almost always wooden beams or iron beams profile "double T" filled with flat brick arches (Prussian vault). The roofs are always wooden, covered with tiles (very rarely sheet). This method of performance is underlying one-man design – the architect was the sole author of the building and has solved all architectural and structural issues including trending calculations. With the advent of reinforced concrete in construction after 1930 calculations begin to make an engineer-constructor.

Here appears the question of details – doors, windows, mostly plaster and stucco, which abound in architectural sculpture of the Arch. Kamen Petkov. Often it was impossible in advance all the details to be drawn – it happened on the construction site, by hand drawings and instructions of the designer with some experience of the contractor, as the architect had the obligation and the right to require several samples to select it Find the best and appropriate.

Also a big role in the construction played and craftsmen, contractors details – plasterers, carpenters and blacksmiths that the architect himself has selected and who knew his tastes and requirements and could only a sketch to understand the thought and desire of the author. They fulfilled with craft experience, without him having to produce countless drawings. For example, the project for the building of Jewish charity, "Shalom alaikum" is located on one single sheet, size 60/80 cm, but in comparison with the project executed building differences were not detected. What could not be shown in the drawing was explained very thorough and clarified during the author's supervision. However, the building is not poor in details. Similar is the case with the project for a residential building on E. Kondodimo the main street No.9. Beautiful facade with its exquisite wrought iron railings not mapped detail. The same applies to the building on the street. "R. Daskalov "5 whose details drapery decorative pilasters, hand-painted by the artist in the area. 1: 1 for many years were kept in his home.

The system of sole design (only architect) divides the year into two periods – in winter designs and draws, and in summer guided construction.

Catholic churches and Catholic Cathedral in Plovdiv

In adulthood Architect Kamen Petkov gets achieving a major task –  with funds granted by the Vatican as an aid for victims of the great earthquake in 1928, the Catholic population in Plovdiv and around the villages. To carry out the design of several projects: restoration of the Catholic cathedral "St. Ludwig"; Catholic school" St. Andrew"; and the Catholic Diocese, all three in Plovdiv. Also Catholic churches in the villages of General Nikolaevo; Sekirovo, Belozem Parchevich and Borets. Arch Petkov received that task after winning a competition among several Bulgarian and Italian architects. The jury is done in the Vatican.

Catholic cathedral "St. Ludwig" in Plovdiv was originally built during the time of Monsignor (Bishop) Andrea Canova from 1850 to 1861 when illuminated. The architect and builder are unknown. During the earthquake the church suffered greatly – broken main facade with two small towers on both sides, in which nearly died Papal Nuncio Monsignor Roncalli, who later became pope under the name John XXIII. The earthquake becomes peak Easter lunch.

In 1929–1930, the architect. Petkov design new front facade in the spirit of Italian neoclassicism. Once the main facade was restored in 1931, the cathedral is lit in 1932, the roof burned, some of the remaining walls are destroyed and requires the building to be renovated. This time arch. Petkov develops its whole interior while retaining the main lines and parts of the foundations of the basilica and directs the work mainly to the interior.

Over bulk is newly poured concrete slab cassette and over it was built wooden roof covered with tiles. The church was buried queen Maria Luisa, mother of King Boris III. Over the sarcophagus was placed portrait statue of the queen of white marble. The sarcophagus and the statue are illuminated through stained with Bulgarian and Bourbon coat of arms. The belfry was built in 1902 by architect Mariano Pernigoni.

Catholic Diocese of Plovdiv. After the earthquake in 1928, simultaneously with the restoration of the cathedral arch. Petkov designs and Metropolis, which is located next to it. Unlike the Catholic cathedral, bishop's palace is emphasized Sezession character [1].

School "St. Andrew "(subsequently School of landscaping) was built in 1931 as a third element in the composition.

Catholic church, the village of General Nikolaev. Catholic church, village Sekirovo – completed in 1931 to winning the Vatican declined competition and several Catholic churches in villages near Plovdiv. The biggest of them are those in the villages of General Nikolaevo and Sekirovo – today districts of Rakovski. They are built on almost identical projects due to long-standing rivalry between the two villages, allow- one of the churches to greater or different, which could be interpreted as "more beautiful." There is some difference in the facade. Are solved as a basilica holds about 2,000 worshipers with two square towers.

Catholic church Belozem – completed in 1931. The church is smaller than that of General Nikolaevo, also with two towers that are more Bulgarian treatment – not Italian campaigns and octagonal vertical volumes.

Catholic church, village Parchevich – completed in 1931, today the town of Rakovski. This church is considerably less than the previous three-aisled cruciform basilica with an octagonal tower above the main entrance. Catholic church, village Fighter – completed in 1931 and the project implementation are the same as those of the church in the village Parchevich.

Uniate Church, Plovdiv – completed in 1931 basilica with clearly marked signs of Orthodox church construction. Stained glass project is Bulgarian artist, and implementation of colored glass and lead frames is done in France. Under the church there is a large crypt, where alongside the portraits of the Pope and Parchevich away and a portrait of the architect. Kamen Petkov.

Recognition

In 1930 Arch. Kamen Petkov, as an active member of IAC (Engineering and Architectural Association) and the 70th anniversary was awarded by the Ministry of Construction and Architecture with the "Civil Merit". In 1992, the Municipal Council of the city decided to name a street in his name. From 2012, the Vocational School of Architecture, Civil Engineering and Geodesy in Plovdiv also bears his name.

For 60 years the Arch. Kamen Petkov designed and built for the City and many of his works can still be seen and illustrate creative searches in the development of modern Bulgarian architecture.

(This biography research is based on a lecture on the life and work of Arch. Kamen Petkov, delivered by his son Arch. Georgi Petkov Kamenov to his colleagues from the Union of Architects in Bulgaria in May 1989)

References 

Bulgarian architects
Art Nouveau architects
Neoclassical architects
1863 births
1945 deaths
People from Vidin Province